Esteghlal Javan ( lit. Youth Esteghlal) is a Persian language daily newspaper published in Iran, founded in 1993.

History and profile 
Esteghlal Javan is a sports and football fan newspaper whose main content is related to Esteghlal Football Club. This newspaper started working in 1993 and at the beginning it was published as a weekly on Tuesdays. Esteghlal Javan later received newspaper ratings and is now published electronically. The newspaper's website, Instagram and Telegram channel are also active. The former editor-in-chief of Esteghlal Javan was Ali Fathollahzadeh and the deputy editor-in-chief is Jafar Nojavan.

Newspaper closure 
According to Ali Fathollahzadeh, the former editor-in-chief of Esteghlal Javan, the publication of the paper version of this newspaper was stopped on 16 December 2015, due to financial losses. The newspaper's website is still active. According to the newspaper's official website, after 28 years, Ali Fathollahzadeh and Ali Agha Mohammadi were removed from the management team of Esteghlal Javan.

References

1993 establishments in Iran
2015 establishments in Iran
Defunct newspapers published in Iran
Newspapers established in 1993
Newspapers published in Tehran
Online newspapers with defunct print editions
Persian-language newspapers
Publications disestablished in 2015
Sports mass media in Iran
Sports newspapers